Orcevia is a genus of Asian jumping spiders first described by Tamerlan Thorell in 1890. Laufeia, circumscribed to include Orcevia, is placed in the tribe Euophryini in the Salticoida clade of Salticinae. It was once considered a synonym of Laufeia, but it was revalidated in 2019.

Species
 it contains six species:
O. eucola Thorell, 1890 – Indonesia (Sumatra)
O. keyserlingi Thorell, 1890 (type) – Indonesia (Sumatra, Java)
O. kuloni Prószyński & Deeleman-Reinhold, 2012 – Indonesia (Java)
O. perakensis (Simon, 1901) – Malaysia, Indonesia (Java)
O. proszynskii (Song, Gu & Chen, 1988) – China
O. terrestris Logunov, 2021 – Vietnam

See also
 Laufeia
 List of Salticidae genera

References

Further reading

Salticidae genera
Taxa named by Tamerlan Thorell
Spiders of Asia